Country Harbour Lake, is a small community in the Canadian province of Nova Scotia, located in the Municipality of the District of Saint Mary's in Guysborough County.

References
Country Harbour Lake, on Destination Nova Scotia

Communities in Guysborough County, Nova Scotia
General Service Areas in Nova Scotia